Monilispira bigemma is an extinct species of sea snail, a marine gastropod mollusc in the family Pseudomelatomidae.

Description
The length of the shell attains 16 mm.

Distribution
Fossils were found in Pliocene strata in Florida, USA

References

 Dall, William Healey. Contributions to the Tertiary Fauna of Florida: With Special Reference to the Miocene Silex-beds of Tampa and the Pliocene Beds of the Caloosahatchie River. Vol. 3. 1890.

bigemma
Taxa named by William Healey Dall
Gastropods described in 1890